Partizanskoye is a rural locality (a selo) and the administrative center of Partizansky Selsoviet, Burlinsky District, Altai Krai, Russia. The population was 542 as of 2013. It was founded in 1968. There are 6 streets.

Geography 
Partizanskoye is located 3 km southwest of Burla (the district's administrative centre) by road. Burla is the nearest rural locality.

References 

Rural localities in Burlinsky District